Helmut Rahn (16 August 1929 – 14 August 2003), known as Der Boss (The Boss), was a German footballer who played as a forward. He became a legend for having scored the winning goal in the final of the 1954 FIFA World Cup (West Germany vs. Hungary 3–2). Rahn, along with the German team, were decorated by the President of the Federal Republic of Germany in 1972.

Career 
Rahn started his career with Altenessen 1912 where he played from 1938 until 1946. Then he went to SC Oelde 09 with a total score of 52 goals for that team. In the 1950–51 season, he played for Sportfreunde Katernberg.

He was most successful when he played for Rot-Weiss Essen from 1951–1959. The team won the DFB-Pokal final in 1953 and won the German Championship in 1955. For one year, from 1959 till 1960 he had played at 1. FC Köln, 1960 he went to Sportclub Enschede in the Netherlands.

In the Bundesliga 1963 he started playing for MSV Duisburg. He finished his career in 1965 because of a knee problem and, along with Hans Schäfer was one of the last members of the 1954 World Cup winning side to retire. His position was that of an outside right.

His legendary status in German football was sparked by the heroic achievement of the German team in the final of the 1954 World Cup.
Germany, whose team members themselves were surprised to be in the final, was playing Hungary, who hadn't lost a single match for four years running up to the World Cup final, and had already beaten Germany 8–3 in the group stage earlier in the tournament. Germany lagged behind 0–2 after only eight minutes, but then pulled it back to 2–2 with Rahn assisting the first German goal and scoring the second. With six minutes remaining, Rahn received the ball just outside the penalty box before going past a Hungarian player and managing to shoot at the lower left corner with his weaker left foot just before being tackled. The ball whistled into the back of the net and Germany went on to win the game 3–2 over the apparently unbeatable Hungarian team. This match is known in Germany as The Miracle of Bern (Das Wunder von Bern) because of its "David versus Goliath"-like setting, and it is generally seen as an instrumental part of the rebuilding of the German people's morale after World War II.

Rahn was also part of the German team that reached semifinals at the 1958 World Cup. With his goal against Yugoslavia, he became at the time the third maximum scorer in World Cups, with 10 total goals (behind Just Fontaine and Sándor Kocsis), and also the first player ever to score at least four goals in two different World Cups.

Rahn played 40 international matches and scored a total of 21 goals. He was known as "Der Boss" ("The Boss") because of his on-field leadership and occasionally as "The Cannon from Essen".

Later life 

After retiring from football, Rahn started his own car dealership in Essen-Altenessen, along Altenessener Street. He was known for his good sense of humour and his joy and ability at talking with others. Many stories about him still circulate throughout Essen. One such story involves a discussion he once had with a friend regarding his car dealership:

Rahn was once asked by a friend, how his car dealership worked. His very direct answer: "I buy a car for 1,000 DM and sell it for 4,000 DM. And I live off the three percent profit."

He died two days shy of his 74th birthday, in Essen. The film The Miracle of Bern was dedicated to him by director Sönke Wortmann.

Family 
In 1953, Rahn married Gerti Seller, and the couple had two sons, Uwe (born 1954) and Klaus Rahn. Rahn is allegedly the cousin of the grandfather of Kevin-Prince Boateng of the Ghana national football team.

Helmut Rahn Memorial 

On 11 July 2004, 50 years after the Bern match, a lifesize statue of Rahn was put up near Georg-Melches-Stadium in Essen, on the square named after him.

Career statistics

Club

International

Honours

Club
Rot-Weiss Essen
 DFB-Pokal: 1952–53
 German football championship: 1955

International
West Germany
 FIFA World Cup: 1954

Individual
 FIFA World Cup All-Star Team: 1954
 FIFA World Cup Silver Boot: 1958
 Ballon d'Or runner-up: 1958

Books 
 Helmut Rahn: Mein Hobby: Tore schießen. 1959,

References

External links 
 
 
 
 Helmut Rahn – The Telegraph
 Helmut Rahn – Miracle Men – The Guardian
 Helmut Rahn – Fußball-Weltmeister Hhelmut Rahn ist tot – Frankfurter Allgemeine Zeitung (in German)

1929 births
2003 deaths
Footballers from Essen
German footballers
West German expatriate footballers
Expatriate footballers in the Netherlands
Germany international footballers
Germany B international footballers
1954 FIFA World Cup players
Recipients of the Silver Laurel Leaf
1958 FIFA World Cup players
FIFA World Cup-winning players
1. FC Köln players
Sportclub Enschede players
MSV Duisburg players
Rot-Weiss Essen players
Bundesliga players
Association football forwards
Automobile salespeople
West German expatriate sportspeople in the Netherlands
West German footballers